Keith Moseley (born February 5, 1965) is an American musician and songwriter, who plays bass guitar among other instruments for The String Cheese Incident, a jamband from Boulder, Colorado, of which he is a founding member.

He has written and provides vocals for a number of songs for the band, including "Resume Man", "Joyful Sound" and "Sometimes a River". Before forming The String Cheese Incident, Moseley  played guitar in the band Whiskey Creek Warriors, which played around the Colorado ski scene.

Equipment

Moseley primarily plays a Lakland 55-94 that he got in 1999. However, he also plays a variety of Fender Precision Basses. For amplification, Moseley uses Aguilar. He currently uses a pair of Aguilar DB751 heads and a pair of DB412 speaker cabinets. He occasionally will perform solo acts, playing acoustic versions of String Cheese Incident songs, and covers. He plays a Martin Dreadnaught acoustic while playing these gigs.

Side projects
In February 2006, Moseley recorded Rex (Live at the Fillmore), a live album under the band name Grateful Grass, featuring fellow musicians Keller Williams and Jeff Austin (Yonder Mountain String Band). Available only for digital download, the album featured non-traditional bluegrass versions of songs by the Grateful Dead, with 100% of the proceeds going to the Rex Foundation. In 2007 he joined Keller Williams' for a project called The WMD's, or Keller Williams with Moseley, Droll and Sipe. In 2010 Keith released a record with The Contribution, a band whose collaborators include Tim Carbone of Railroad Earth as well as members of New Monsoon.

References

External links
String Cheese Incident official website
Keith Moseley interview from 2006

1965 births
Living people
Songwriters from Oklahoma
20th-century American bass guitarists
The String Cheese Incident members
American rock bass guitarists